The 1977 Hang Ten 400 was an endurance race for Group C Touring Cars. The race was held on 11 September 1977 at the Sandown Park circuit in Victoria, Australia over a total distance of 400 km. It was Round 8 of the 1977 Australian Touring Car Championship and Round 1 of the 1977 Australian Championship of Makes. 

Cars competed in four engine capacity classes:
 Class A: 3001 to 6000cc
 Class B: 2001 to 3000cc
 Class C: 1301 to 2000cc
 Class D: Up to 1300cc

Results

References

Further reading
 Stewart Wilson & Max Stahl, The Australian racing history of Ford, 1989
 Stewart Wilson, Holden, The Official Racing History, 1988
 CAMS Manual of Motor Sport, 1977, pages 89&90

Motorsport at Sandown
Hang Ten 400
Pre-Bathurst 500